Shadab may refer to:

People
Shadab Zeest Hashmi (b. 1972), Pakistani poet
Shadab Kabir (b. 1977), Pakistani cricketer
Shadab Khan (b. 1998), Pakistani cricketer
Shadab Jakati (b. 1980), Indian cricketer

Places
Shadab, Fars, a village in Fars Province, Iran
Shadab, Kahnuj, a village in Kerman Province, Iran
Shadab, Razavi Khorasan, a village in Razavi Khorasan Province, Iran

Pakistani masculine given names